The NJIT Highlanders men’s lacrosse team is a college lacrosse team that represents New Jersey Institute of Technology in Newark, New Jersey, United States. In December 2013, Travis Johnson was hired as the first head coach in the history of the program. It was announced on 6/15/2020 that NJIT athletics would be joining the America East Conference for the 2020-21 academic year, meaning the Highlanders lacrosse team would belong to a conference for the very first time in the 2021 season.

Year by year results
{| class="wikitable"

|- align="center"

†NCAA canceled 2020 collegiate activities due to the COVID-19 virus.

References

External links
 Official website

College men's lacrosse teams in the United States
NJIT Highlanders